This is a list of hotels in Ponce, Puerto Rico, Puerto Rico's second largest city outside the San Juan metropolitan area. The list includes the number of guest rooms and floors.  When a hotel consists of more than one building structure, the number of floors given is that of the tallest structure.

Hotel list summary table
The following table lists hotels by their number of rooms. A listing sorted by any of the other fields can be obtained by clicking on the header of the field. For example, clicking on "Barrio" will sort hospitals by their barrio location.

Key:
C. = Calle (street)
NB = Northbound
SB = Southbound
WB = Westbound
EB = Eastbound
Unk = Unknown
N/A = Not applicable

References

Hotels in Ponce, Puerto Rico
hospitals
Hotels, Ponce